Methandriol dipropionate (MADP), also known as methylandrostenediol dipropionate and sold under the brand names Arbolic, Durabolic, Or-Bolic, Probolik, and Protabolin among others, is a synthetic, injected anabolic-androgenic steroid (AAS) and a 17α-alkylated derivative of 5-androstenediol. It is an androgen ester – specifically, the C3,17β dipropionate ester of methandriol (17α-methyl-5-androstenediol) – and acts as a prodrug of methandriol in the body. Methandriol dipropionate is administered by intramuscular injection and, relative to methandriol, has an extended duration via this route of several days due to a depot effect afforded by its ester. It was marketed in the United States, but is no longer available in this country.

See also
 List of androgen esters § Esters of other synthetic AAS
 Estradiol benzoate/progesterone/methandriol dipropionate

References

External links
 

Androgen esters
Androgens and anabolic steroids
Androstanes
Prodrugs
Propionate esters
World Anti-Doping Agency prohibited substances